Dunbar Isidore Heath (3 March 1816, in London – 27 May 1888) was an English clergyman prosecuted for heresy in 1861; he was a Cambridge Apostle.

Life
Dunbar Heath was the third son of George Heath, serjeant-at-law. He was educated at Trinity College, Cambridge, where he was elected scholar in 1836, and graduated B.A. in 1838. From 1840 to 1847 he was a fellow of Trinity. As a recognized authority on Egyptology, he was one of the early translators of the papyri in the British Museum. In 1852 Heath wrote The Future Human Kingdom of Christ, in which he distinguished the “saved nations from the glorified saints” by outlining an early concept of “the two salvations.” He was prosecuted for heresy in 1861 by the Bishop of Winchester and sentenced by the Court of Arches for publishing these ideas. He would not recant and tried to appeal his sentence by attempting to defend his character and doctrine from the Scriptures through the writing of several booklets. All of this failed and as a result of this prosecution he suffered not only the loss of his profession, but sustained heavy financial losses as well.

Heath edited the Journal of Anthropology.

References

English Egyptologists
Alumni of Trinity College, Cambridge
Fellows of Trinity College, Cambridge
British Christian writers
Heresy in Christianity
Protestant writers
1816 births
1888 deaths